Estadio Luis Amílcar Moreno is a multi-use stadium in San Francisco Gotera, El Salvador.  It is currently the home for C.D. Chaguite, used mostly for football matches and was the home stadium of C.D. Vista Hermosa. The stadium currently holds 2,000 people.

Football venues in El Salvador
2010s establishments in El Salvador
2016 establishments in North America
Sports venues completed in 2016